The  Mitteldorf Preserve in Big Sur, California, is owned by to the Big Sur Land Trust. It is located between Joshua Creek Canyon Ecological Reserve to the south, Palo Corona Regional Park on the north, and Santa Lucia Preserve to the east.

Harriet and Arthur Mitteldorf donated the funds to purchase the property in 1990. Mitteldorf conserves the largest Redwood trees in Monterey County. It also protects madrone, oak woodland, coastal chaparral, and grassland habitats. Williams Canyon Road through the preserve provides emergency access first responders. The road is an essential road for the California Department of Forestry Palo Corona Fuels Reduction Project. The trust began developing infrastructure for a nature camp and research program when the Soberanes Fire destroyed the barn and burned much of the habitat. Access is restricted to BSLT members.

References 

Big Sur
Monterey County, California